tmux is an open-source terminal multiplexer for Unix-like operating systems. It allows multiple terminal sessions to be accessed simultaneously in a single window. It is useful for running more than one command-line program at the same time. It can also be used to detach processes from their controlling terminals, allowing remote sessions to remain active without being visible.

Features
tmux includes most features of GNU Screen. It allows users to start a terminal session with clients that are not bound to a specific physical or virtual console; multiple terminal sessions can be created within a single terminal session and then freely rebound from one virtual console to another, and each session can have several connected clients.

Some notable tmux features are:
 Menus for interactive selection of running sessions, windows or clients
 Window can be linked to an arbitrary number of sessions
 vi-like or Emacs command mode (with auto completion) for managing tmux
 Lack of built-in serial and telnet clients.
 Different command keys—it is not a drop-in replacement for screen, but can be configured to use compatible keybindings
 Vertical and horizontal Window split support

Adoption
tmux is included in the OpenBSD base system, and is available as a package for many other Unix-like operating systems.

See also

 Byobu (software)
 Mosh (software)
 Twin (windowing system)
 xpra

References

Unix software
Terminfo
Terminal multiplexers
Free software programmed in C
Software using the ISC license